Vergakiemis is a village in Jakėnai Eldership, Varėna District Municipality, Alytus County, in southeastern Lithuania. As of the 2011 census, the population was 34.

Geography 
The village is located in southeastern Lithuania, in the northern part of Varėna District Municipality. The surrounding landscape is made up of wetland, peat bog and forest, and the village sits between two small lakes, namely, Lake Lielukas to the northeast and Lake Juodikis to the southwest.

Demographics 
As of the census of 2011, there were 34 people, of which 52.9% were male and 47.1% female.

As of the census of 2001, there were 41 people, of which 51.2% were male and 48.8% female.

Transportation 

The village lies on the national road K4724 (Onuškis–Žilinai–Puodžiai) with links north and south.

Notable people 
 Juozas Jermalavičius, the political activist and historian of the Lithuanian Soviet Socialist Republic imprisoned for his role in the January Events of 1991, was born in the village

References 

Villages in Varėna District Municipality